This is a list of the municipalities in the province of A Coruña, in the autonomous community of Galicia, Spain.

The Galician name is the sole official 

Older or informal texts may use Castillan forms or spellings.

References

See also

Geography of Spain
List of municipalities of Spain

Coruna